This is a list of Lithuanian language exonyms for places outside the Republic of Lithuania.

Albania

Austria

Belarus

Belgium

Denmark

Estonia

France

Italy

Latvia

Netherlands

Moldova

Poland

Portugal

Romania

Russia
Most of these places are in Kaliningrad Oblast; which is nearly the same area as Lithuania Minor.

Serbia

Spain

Switzerland

See also
List of European exonyms
Names of Belarusian places in other languages

External links
List of traditional Lithuanian place names in Belarus
List of traditional Lithuanian place names in Latvia
List of traditional Lithuanian place names in Kaliningrad Oblast, Russia (German-Lithuanian)
List of traditional Lithuanian place names in Kaliningrad Oblast, Russia (Russian-Lithuanian)
List of traditional Lithuanian place names in Poland

Exonyms
Lists of exonyms
Exonyms